The following is a partial list of the "C" codes for Medical Subject Headings (MeSH), as defined by the United States National Library of Medicine (NLM).

This list continues the information at List of MeSH codes (C13). Codes following these are found at List of MeSH codes (C15). For other MeSH codes, see List of MeSH codes.

The source for this content is the set of 2006 MeSH Trees from the NLM.

– cardiovascular diseases

– cardiovascular abnormalities

– arterio-arterial fistula

– arteriovenous malformations
  – arteriovenous fistula
  – intracranial arteriovenous malformations

– central nervous system vascular malformations

– heart defects, congenital
  – alagille syndrome
  – aortic coarctation
  – arrhythmogenic right ventricular dysplasia
  – cor triatriatum
  – coronary vessel anomalies
  – crisscross heart
  – dextrocardia
  – kartagener syndrome
  – ductus arteriosus, patent
  – Ebstein's anomaly
  – Eisenmenger complex
  – heart septal defects
  – aortopulmonary septal defect
  – endocardial cushion defects
  – heart septal defects, atrial
  – Lutembacher's syndrome
  – trilogy of Fallot
  – heart septal defects, ventricular
  – hypoplastic left heart syndrome
  – leopard syndrome
  – levocardia
  – Marfan syndrome
  – tetralogy of Fallot
  – transposition of great vessels
  – double outlet right ventricle
  – tricuspid atresia
  – truncus arteriosus, persistent

– pulmonary atresia

– scimitar syndrome

– heart diseases

– arrhythmia
  – arrhythmia, sinus
  – atrial fibrillation
  – atrial flutter
  – bradycardia
  – cardiac complexes, premature
  – atrial premature complexes
  – ventricular premature complexes
  – heart block
  – Adams–Stokes syndrome
  – bundle-branch block
  – sinoatrial block
  – long QT syndrome
  – Andersen syndrome
  – Jervell and Lange-Nielsen syndrome
  – Romano–Ward syndrome
  – parasystole
  – pre-excitation syndromes
  – Lown–Ganong–Levine syndrome
  – pre-excitation, mahaim-type
  – Wolff–Parkinson–White syndrome
  – sick sinus syndrome
  – tachycardia
  – tachycardia, paroxysmal
  – tachycardia, supraventricular
  – accelerated idioventricular rhythm
  – tachycardia, atrioventricular nodal reentry
  – tachycardia, ectopic atrial
  – tachycardia, ectopic junctional
  – tachycardia, sinoatrial nodal reentry
  – tachycardia, sinus
  – tachycardia, ventricular
  – arrhythmogenic right ventricular dysplasia
  – torsades de pointes
  – ventricular fibrillation

– carcinoid heart disease

– cardiac output, high

– cardiac output, low

– cardiac tamponade

– cardiomegaly
  – cardiomyopathy, dilated
  – hypertrophy, left ventricular
  – hypertrophy, right ventricular

– cardiomyopathies
  – cardiomyopathy, alcoholic
  – cardiomyopathy, dilated
  – cardiomyopathy, hypertrophic
  – cardiomyopathy, hypertrophic, familial
  – cardiomyopathy, restrictive
  – chagas cardiomyopathy
  – endocardial fibroelastosis
  – endomyocardial fibrosis
  – glycogen storage disease type iib
  – Kearns–Sayre syndrome
  – myocardial reperfusion injury
  – myocarditis

– endocarditis
  – endocarditis, bacterial
  – endocarditis, subacute bacterial

– heart aneurysm

– heart arrest
  – death, sudden, cardiac

– heart defects, congenital
  – aortic coarctation
  – arrhythmogenic right ventricular dysplasia
  – cor triatriatum
  – coronary vessel anomalies
  – crisscross heart
  – dextrocardia
  – Kartagener syndrome
  – ductus arteriosus, patent
  – Ebstein's anomaly
  – Eisenmenger complex
  – heart septal defects
  – aortopulmonary septal defect
  – endocardial cushion defects
  – heart septal defects, atrial
  – Lutembacher's syndrome
  – trilogy of Fallot
  – heart septal defects, ventricular
  – hypoplastic left heart syndrome
  – leopard syndrome
  – levocardia
  – Marfan syndrome
  – tetralogy of Fallot
  – transposition of great vessels
  – double outlet right ventricle
  – tricuspid atresia
  – truncus arteriosus, persistent

– heart failure, congestive
  – cardiomyopathy, dilated
  – dyspnea, paroxysmal
  – edema, cardiac

– heart neoplasms

– heart rupture
  – heart rupture, post-infarction
  – ventricular septal rupture

– heart valve diseases
  – aortic valve insufficiency
  – aortic valve stenosis
  – aortic stenosis, supravalvular
  – williams syndrome
  – aortic stenosis, subvalvular
  – cardiomyopathy, hypertrophic
  – discrete subaortic stenosis
  – heart murmurs
  – heart valve prolapse
  – aortic valve prolapse
  – mitral valve prolapse
  – tricuspid valve prolapse
  – mitral valve insufficiency
  – mitral valve stenosis
  – pulmonary atresia
  – pulmonary valve insufficiency
  – pulmonary valve stenosis
  – leopard syndrome
  – pulmonary subvalvular stenosis
  – tricuspid atresia
  – tricuspid valve insufficiency
  – tricuspid valve stenosis

– myocardial ischemia
  – coronary disease
  – angina pectoris
  – angina, unstable
  – angina pectoris, variant
  – microvascular angina
  – coronary aneurysm
  – Coronary Arteriosclerosis
  – coronary stenosis
  – coronary restenosis
  – coronary thrombosis
  – coronary vasospasm
  – angina pectoris, variant
  – myocardial infarction
  – myocardial stunning
  – shock, cardiogenic
  – myocardial stunning

– pericardial effusion

– pericarditis
  – pericarditis, constrictive
  – pericarditis, tuberculous

– pneumopericardium

– postpericardiotomy syndrome

– pulmonary heart disease

– rheumatic heart disease

– ventricular dysfunction
  – ventricular dysfunction, left
  – ventricular dysfunction, right

– Ventricular outflow tract obstruction

– hyperemia

– pregnancy complications, cardiovascular

– embolism, amniotic fluid

– scimitar syndrome

– syphilis, cardiovascular

– tuberculosis, cardiovascular

– pericarditis, tuberculous

– vascular diseases

– aneurysm
  – aneurysm, dissecting
  – carotid artery, internal, dissection
  – vertebral artery dissection
  – aneurysm, false
  – aneurysm, infected
  – aneurysm, ruptured
  – aortic rupture
  – aortic aneurysm
  – aortic aneurysm, abdominal
  – aortic aneurysm, thoracic
  – aortic rupture
  – coronary aneurysm
  – heart aneurysm
  – iliac aneurysm
  – intracranial aneurysm

– angiodysplasia
  – gastric antral vascular ectasia

– angiomatosis
  – angiomatosis, bacillary
  – Von Hippel–Lindau disease
  – Klippel–Trénaunay syndrome
  – Sturge–Weber syndrome

– angioneurotic edema

– aortic diseases
  – aortic aneurysm
  – aortic aneurysm, abdominal
  – aortic aneurysm, thoracic
  – aortic rupture
  – aortic arch syndromes
  – takayasu's arteritis
  – aortitis
  – leriche's syndrome

– arterial occlusive diseases
  – arteriosclerosis
  – arteriolosclerosis
  – arteriosclerosis obliterans
  – atherosclerosis
  – intracranial arteriosclerosis
  – dementia, vascular
  – Coronary arteriosclerosis
  – intermittent claudication
  – Monckeberg medial calcific sclerosis
  – carotid stenosis
  – fibromuscular dysplasia
  – Leriche's syndrome
  – mesenteric vascular occlusion
  – moyamoya disease
  – renal artery obstruction
  – retinal artery occlusion
  – thromboangiitis obliterans

– arteriovenous malformations
  – arteriovenous fistula
  – intracranial arteriovenous malformations

– arteritis
  – aids arteritis, central nervous system
  – endarteritis
  – polyarteritis nodosa
  – takayasu's arteritis
  – temporal arteritis

– capillary leak syndrome

– cerebrovascular disorders
  – basal ganglia cerebrovascular disease
  – basal ganglia hemorrhage
  – putaminal hemorrhage
  – carotid artery diseases
  – carotid artery thrombosis
  – carotid artery injuries
  – carotid artery, internal, dissection
  – carotid-cavernous sinus fistula
  – carotid artery, internal, dissection
  – carotid stenosis
  – carotid-cavernous sinus fistula
  – moyamoya disease
  – intracranial arteriovenous malformations
  – cerebral arterial diseases
  – cadasil
  – infarction, anterior cerebral artery
  – infarction, middle cerebral artery
  – infarction, posterior cerebral artery
  – moyamoya disease
  – intracranial embolism and thrombosis
  – carotid artery thrombosis
  – intracranial embolism
  – intracranial thrombosis
  – sinus thrombosis, intracranial
  – cavernous sinus thrombosis
  – lateral sinus thrombosis
  – sagittal sinus thrombosis
  – cerebral hemorrhage
  – basal ganglia hemorrhage
  – putaminal hemorrhage
  – cerebral hemorrhage, traumatic
  – brain ischemia
  – cerebrovascular accident
  – brain infarction
  – brain stem infarctions
  – lateral medullary syndrome
  – cerebral infarction
  – infarction, anterior cerebral artery
  – infarction, middle cerebral artery
  – infarction, posterior cerebral artery
  – cerebrovascular trauma
  – carotid artery injuries
  – carotid artery, internal, dissection
  – carotid-cavernous sinus fistula
  – subarachnoid hemorrhage, traumatic
  – vertebral artery dissection
  – hypoxia-ischemia, brain
  – brain ischemia
  – ischemic attack, transient
  – hypoxia, brain
  – intracranial arterial diseases
  – cerebral arterial diseases
  – cadasil
  – cerebral amyloid angiopathy
  – cerebral amyloid angiopathy, familial
  – infarction, anterior cerebral artery
  – infarction, middle cerebral artery
  – infarction, posterior cerebral artery
  – intracranial aneurysm
  – intracranial arteriosclerosis
  – dementia, vascular
  – intracranial arteriovenous malformations
  – intracranial hemorrhages
  – cerebral hemorrhage
  – basal ganglia hemorrhage
  – putaminal hemorrhage
  – cerebral hemorrhage, traumatic
  – intracranial hemorrhage, hypertensive
  – intracranial hemorrhage, traumatic
  – brain hemorrhage, traumatic
  – brain stem hemorrhage, traumatic
  – cerebral hemorrhage, traumatic
  – hematoma, epidural, cranial
  – hematoma, subdural
  – hematoma, subdural, acute
  – hematoma, subdural, chronic
  – hematoma, subdural, intracranial
  – subarachnoid hemorrhage, traumatic
  – pituitary apoplexy
  – subarachnoid hemorrhage
  – subarachnoid hemorrhage, traumatic
  – leukomalacia, periventricular
  – sneddon syndrome
  – vascular headaches
  – vasculitis, central nervous system
  – aids arteritis, central nervous system
  – lupus vasculitis, central nervous system
  – temporal arteritis
  – vasospasm, intracranial
  – vertebral artery dissection
  – vertebrobasilar insufficiency
  – subclavian steal syndrome

– diabetic angiopathies
  – diabetic foot
  – diabetic retinopathy

– embolism and thrombosis
  – embolism
  – embolism, air
  – embolism, amniotic fluid
  – embolism, cholesterol
  – blue toe syndrome
  – embolism, fat
  – pulmonary embolism
  – thromboembolism
  – intracranial embolism and thrombosis
  – carotid artery thrombosis
  – intracranial embolism
  – intracranial thrombosis
  – sinus thrombosis, intracranial
  – cavernous sinus thrombosis
  – lateral sinus thrombosis
  – sagittal sinus thrombosis
  – embolism, paradoxical
  – thrombosis
  – coronary thrombosis
  – purpura, thrombotic thrombocytopenic
  – thromboembolism
  – intracranial embolism and thrombosis
  – carotid artery thrombosis
  – intracranial embolism
  – intracranial thrombosis
  – sinus thrombosis, intracranial
  – cavernous sinus thrombosis
  – lateral sinus thrombosis
  – sagittal sinus thrombosis
  – embolism, paradoxical
  – venous thrombosis
  – hepatic vein thrombosis
  – retinal vein occlusion
  – thrombophlebitis

– erythromelalgia

– hemorrhoids

– hepatic veno-occlusive disease

– hypertension
  – hypertension, malignant
  – hypertension, pregnancy-induced
  – hypertension, renal
  – hypertension, renovascular

– hypotension
  – hypotension, orthostatic
  – Shy–Drager syndrome

– ischemia
  – brain ischemia
  – colitis, ischemic
  – compartment syndromes
  – anterior compartment syndrome
  – infarction
  – brain infarction
  – brain stem infarctions
  – lateral medullary syndrome
  – cerebral infarction
  – dementia, multi-infarct
  – infarction, anterior cerebral artery
  – infarction, middle cerebral artery
  – infarction, posterior cerebral artery
  – myocardial infarction
  – myocardial stunning
  – shock, cardiogenic
  – pulmonary embolism
  – splenic infarction
  – myocardial ischemia
  – coronary disease
  – angina pectoris
  – angina pectoris, variant
  – angina, unstable
  – microvascular angina
  – coronary aneurysm
  – Coronary Arteriosclerosis
  – coronary stenosis
  – coronary restenosis
  – coronary thrombosis
  – coronary vasospasm
  – angina pectoris, variant
  – myocardial infarction
  – myocardial stunning
  – shock, cardiogenic
  – myocardial stunning
  – optic neuropathy, ischemic
  – reperfusion injury
  – myocardial reperfusion injury
  – spinal cord ischemia
  – anterior spinal artery syndrome

– peripheral vascular diseases

– phlebitis
  – postphlebitic syndrome
  – thrombophlebitis

– pulmonary veno-occlusive disease

– Raynaud disease
  – CREST syndrome

– retinal vein occlusion

– scimitar syndrome

– spinal cord vascular diseases
  – anterior spinal artery syndrome
  – spinal cord ischemia
  – anterior spinal artery syndrome

– superior vena cava syndrome

– telangiectasis
  – ataxia telangiectasia
  – CREST syndrome
  – telangiectasia, hereditary hemorrhagic

– thoracic outlet syndrome
  – cervical rib syndrome

– varicocele

– varicose veins
  – varicose ulcer

– vascular fistula
  – arterio-arterial fistula
  – arteriovenous fistula

– vascular hemostatic disorders
  – cryoglobulinemia
  – Ehlers–Danlos syndrome
  – hemangioma, cavernous
  – hemangioma, cavernous, central nervous system
  – multiple myeloma
  – pseudoxanthoma elasticum
  – purpura, hyperglobulinemic
  – purpura, schoenlein-henoch
  – scurvy
  – Shwartzman phenomenon
  – telangiectasia, hereditary hemorrhagic
  – Waldenstrom macroglobulinemia

– vascular neoplasms

– vasculitis
  – aortitis
  – arteritis
  – aids arteritis, central nervous system
  – endarteritis
  – polyarteritis nodosa
  – Takayasu's arteritis
  – temporal arteritis
  – Behcet syndrome
  – Churg–Strauss syndrome
  – mucocutaneous lymph node syndrome
  – phlebitis
  – thrombophlebitis
  – retinal vasculitis
  – Shwartzman phenomenon
  – thromboangiitis obliterans
  – vasculitis, central nervous system
  – aids arteritis, central nervous system
  – lupus vasculitis, central nervous system
  – temporal arteritis
  – vasculitis, hypersensitivity
  – purpura, schoenlein-henoch
  – vasculitis, allergic cutaneous
  – granulomatosis with polyangiitis

– venous insufficiency
  – postphlebitic syndrome

The list continues at List of MeSH codes (C15).

C14